Beeveema is a 2023 Maldivian film written and directed by Ahmed Zareer. Produced by Mohamed Ali and Aishath Fuad Thaufeeq under Dark Rain Entertainment, the film stars Mariyam Ashfa, Ismail Rasheed, Aminath Rashfa and Adam Zidhan in pivotal roles. The film was released in theatres on 6 February 2023.

Premise
The film revolves around the reunion of former students twenty-two years after their graduation. During this reunion, two former lovers, Raniya and Ayaz get the opportunity to resolve issues surrounding their breakup.

Cast 
 Mariyam Ashfa as Raniya
 Ismail Rasheed as Ayaz
 Aminath Rashfa as young Raniya
 Adam Zidhan as young Ayaz
 Ibrahim Aman
 Ahmed Sunie
 Hassan Irufaan
 Ali Shazleem
 Aishath Yaadha
 Aishath Ali
 Huneysha Adam
 Aminath Silna
 Mariyam Waheedha
 Aminath Noora
 Ali Mahir
 Adam Rizwee

Development
The project was announced in August 2020 as the first feature film direction by screenwriter Ahmed Zareer. On 7 September 2020 it was revealed that playback singer Mariyam Ashfa will make her film debut in Beeveema and will play the lead role of the film alongside Ismail Rasheed. In February 2021, producer Mohamed Ali announced that the film will introduce seven newcomers in prominent roles of the film.

First schedule of filming took place in between the lockdowns imposed due to COVID-19 pandemic. Producer Mohamed Ali shared that restrictions imposed due to COVID-19 pandemic affected the production as it became mandatory to follow the safety and health guidelines at all times of shoot. Second schedule of filming commenced in December 2021 at V. Keyodhoo. Filming was completed in January 2022.

Post-production of the film was handled by Ali Shifau. A rough edit of the film of length over three hours was completed in February 2022. As insisted by director Zareer, trimming of the film had cut its runtime by around forty-five minutes. Dubbing for the film commenced in March 2022.

Soundtrack

Release and response
The film was released theatrically on 6 February 2023. It marks as the first film screened at Olympus Cinema after modernizing the infrastructure and its re-opening on 4 February 2023.

Upon release, the film received mainly positive reviews from critics. Aminath Luba from The Press praised the acting performance of the lead actors and she applauded Ismail Rasheed for his consistently good performance, Aminath Rashfa for establishing herself as a confident performer and the two newcomers (Mariyam Ashfa and Adam Zaidhan) for delivering an impactful performance in their debut appearance. Calling the film a "better adaptation of the inspiration", Luba particularly praised the work of cameraman Ibrahim Wisan for trying to immerse the audience in the 1990s.

Ahmed Hameed Adam from Minoos singled out the performance of Ashfa as the most pleasant surprise of the film: "Ashfa in her element was different, talented and extremely natural. It does not even feel like it is her debut performance". Furthermore, Adam opined that the relevancy of the film with its backstory plugs the right emotion of the audience. Similar sentiments were echoed by Inayath Ali from Kulhudhuffushi Online. Apart from praising the lead actors, Ali wrote: "As much as Ashfa surprises us with her performance, Zareer's debut role as a director is also praiseworthy. The film is different than the usual DRE's projects and hopefully a new beginning of a positive change".

However, Ahmed Nadheem from Dhauru criticized the filmmakers for calling the film an "inspiration" of Tamil film '96 (2018) while it is a "frame-to-frame copy of the same": "The truth is that there is no film titled Beeveema, rather a copied product, wasting the time, skills, money and resources". After its publication, Dark Rain Entertainment released a public statement, condemning the author and Dhauru news website for its "lack of research and professionalism". The team further stated that they have not "intended not tried to conceal the truth from public"; it is an inspiration of the Tamil film which itself is based on other films including Alex Lehmann's Blue Jay (2016).

References

2023 films
Maldivian romantic drama films